The 2013 NBL Canada Finals was the championship series of the 2012–13 National Basketball League of Canada season and the conclusion of the season's playoffs. The Central Division champions London Lightning played against the Atlantic Division champions Summerside Storm, in a best-of-five series. The London Lightning the series 3–1. The Finals began on April 6, and ended on April 12. The Lightning claimed their second title in a row and Marvin Phillips was named Finals MVP.

Series

All times are in Eastern Daylight Time (UTC-4)

Game 1

Game 2

Game 3

Game 4

References

External links
NBL Canada Championship Playoff Bracket

National Basketball League of Canada Finals
Finals